Patrick Seifert (born April 22, 1990) is a German professional ice hockey defenceman who is currently playing for the Ravensburg Towerstars of the DEL2. He most recently played for Krefeld Pinguine of the Deutsche Eishockey Liga (DEL).

Playing career
After seven seasons within the Augsburger Panther organization, Seifert left as a free agent to sign a two-year contract with Grizzlys Wolfsburg of the DEL on April 14, 2015.

Seifert enjoyed a career best season in the final year of his contract with Wolfsburg in 2016–17, appearing in 44 games from the blueline in contributing with 3 goals and 12 points. As a free agent, Seifert opted to join his third DEL club in agreeing to a one-year contract with Krefeld Pinguine on May 5, 2017.

In the 2018–19 season, his second with the Krefeld, Trettenes contributed with 4 points in 24 games before leaving as a free agent at the conclusion of the year.

References

External links
 

1990 births
Living people
German ice hockey defencemen
Augsburger Panther players
ESV Kaufbeuren players
Krefeld Pinguine players
EV Landsberg players
EHC München players
SC Riessersee players
Sportspeople from Augsburg
Grizzlys Wolfsburg players